Chicken Little is a 2005 action-adventure game developed by Avalanche Software for GameCube, Microsoft Windows, PlayStation 2, and Xbox, and by Artificial Mind and Movement for the Game Boy Advance; both were published by Buena Vista Games. Based on the 2005 film  of the same name, they were released in October 2005.

Plot
The game follows the same plot as the 2005 film of the same name. The game also features the original actors reprising their roles in the game, except for Joan Cusack (Abby) and Don Knotts (Mayor Turkey Lurkey) (who are both replaced by Pamela Adlon and Jeff Bennett respectively).

Gameplay
The game is set as an action-adventure game, in which it's very similar to Tak and the Power of Juju. The player takes control of Chicken Little throughout the entire game, and occasionally the player will be able to play as Abby, Runt, and Fish Out of Water in six different levels and Mayor Turkey Lurkey in one level. The player also has to collect five baseball cards throughout each level of the game, the cards will help unlock special bonus mini-games in multiplayer mode.

Reception 

Chicken Little received "mixed or average reviews" on all platforms according to video game review aggregator Metacritic.

Sequel
A sequel to the game, titled Chicken Little: Ace in Action, was released for the PlayStation 2, Nintendo DS, and Wii on November 9 and December 11, 2006, and for Microsoft Windows on February 24, 2015.

References

External links 
 

2005 video games
Action-adventure games
Avalanche Software games
Game Boy Advance games
GameCube games
PlayStation 2 games
Video games about birds
Video games based on films
Video games developed in Canada
Video games developed in the United States
Windows games
Xbox games
3D platform games
Disney video games
D3 Publisher games
Chicken Little (franchise)